Faizul Latif Chowdhury (born 3 June 1959) is a civil servant from Bangladesh, who currently serves as the director general of Bangladesh National Museum. Chowdhury has written on a variety of academic topics, including corruption in public administration, tax policy , economics of tax evasion and tax avoidance, smuggling, and international trade policy. He is also a translator of Bengali poetry, and has researched the modern poet Jibanananda Das. Currently he works at Independent University Bangladesh as adjunct professor business.

Education and training
Chowdhury studied science at the high school and pre-university college in Mymensingh, Bangladesh. He went to Mymensingh Zilla School for SSC and Ananda Mohan College for HSC. Later he studied Economics at the University of Dhaka for his Bachelor of Social Science and Master of Social Science degrees. He studied public policy at the Deakin University, Australia. Later, in 1992, he obtained his MBA from the Monash University. Professor Owen Hughes was his thesis supervisor. Finally he studied public administration and public policy at the Department of Government at the London School of Economics and Political Science (LSE). At the LSE, Professor Keith Dowding was his dissertation supervisor. At different times he received training on information technology

Career

Chowdhury's professional career started in free-lance journalism in the Kishore Bangla, a juvenile weekly published from Dhaka. However, his literary career commenced when he started to write for the Bangladesh Observer and the daily Purbadesh in his school days, since 1973. In 1974, for a brief period, he edited the children's page of Banglar Darpan, a Bengali weekly published from Mymensingh since 1972. Later he worked for a while (1978–80) for the weekly Kishore Bangla, a juvenile magazine published from Dhaka. Then he worked as the Feature Editor in the Saptahik Chitrabangla (1981–83). Just after finishing education at the Dhaka University, Chowdhury briefly worked at the Planning Division of the Rupali Bank as a senior officer.

Towards the end of 1983, he joined the Bangladesh Civil Service as a fast-track career civil servant. He worked at the National Board of Revenue and its attached offices for a long time in different capacities (1983–2000) until he was appointed as a deputy secretary to the Government of Bangladesh in 2001. He was promoted as joint secretary to the government in 2005.

Meanwhile, he also worked as a national consultant in two projects, one funded by the World Bank and the other by Norway. He also worked in the Prime Minister's Office as director in charge of the Ministries of Finance, Planning, ERD, IMED, Statistics and IRD. In 2003, he was appointed by the government as a diplomat for four years. In 2008, National Board of Revenue of Bangladesh appointed him as research and statistics expert on its Modernization and Automation Project. At present he working as the director general of Bangladesh National Museum. Between 2009 and 2014 he worked as director and chief operating officer of GeneSys Technology Group. For a brief period he worked as COO of the Prothom Alo during 2009-2010 period. Since 2010 he has been an adjunct professor at the Independent University Bangladesh.

Chowdhury involved himself with many publications and publishing houses. He engineered establishment of two publishing houses, namely Adhuna Prokashony and Desh Prokashan. He played a vital role in the publication of a monthly literary magazine titled Dwitiyo Chinta (tr. Second Thought), published from Mymensingh town and edited by Iffat Ara since 1985. He also conceived and organized publication of monthly Adhuna (1985–1987), a top-rate literary magazine edited by poet Shamsur Rahman. He worked as the Literary editor of the daily Banglabazaar Patrika for a brief period (1992–93).

Literary works

Poet Jibanananda Das
Chowdhury has worked extensively on life and works of Bengal's most popular modern poet Jibanananda Das. He has published a number of titles on his poetry. He has translated a number of Jibanananda poems into English, reviewed a number of poems, and written articles on the literary works and style of the poet. He has collected and published all the non-fictional prose works of poet Jibanananda Das. He considers Jibanananda Das as a poet with all signs of post-modern poetry. His latest work on the poet, titled  Essays on Jibanananda Das was published in 2009. In 2015 he collected and published 101 letters of poet Jibanananda Das in a volume.

Translation
Chowdhury has translated a number of major Bengali poets into English. His Poems from Jibanananda Das published in 1995 collects poems of Bengal's most important modernist poet Jibanananda Das. He published Beyond Land and Time, a collection of one hundred poems of Jibanananda Das in English translation. He edited Voice of Hayat Saif, a compilation of poems of 1960s Bengali poet Hayat Saif translated into English. He has also translated fiction of Maltese fictionist Oliver Friggieri and, Booker awardee Arundhati Roy of India, among others.

Economic works
Chowdhury has dealt several aspects of applied economics. His works include revenue administration, economics of tax evasion, design of value added tax, economics of smuggling, rent-seeking by public servants, economics of corruption, tax administration and tax evasion, tax farming and making of budgetary policy, among others.

Economics of customs evasion
Since 1973, a huge volume of works has been produced on the economics of tax evasion. However, most of the researches have focused mainly on evasion of income tax and other sorts of taxes, particularly indirect taxes, have been neglected. Chowdhury, in 1992, produced an economic model of evasion of customs duty which is the pre-dominant form of tax in low income countries around the world. This model is built upon the economics of crime model developed by Nobel Laureate economist Gary Becker. Chowdhury has explained that, when an opportunity exists, the level of customs evasion depends on two important factors, namely, probability of detection and level of statutory penalty. He expanded the model by factoring in bribe which leads to accountability conspiracy and, consequently, detection is not reported to the authority.

Production-substituting smuggling
Research on smuggling is scanty. Bhagwati and Hansen first forwarded a theory of smuggling in which they saw smuggling essentially as an import-substituting economic activity In contrast, Chowdhury, in 1999, suggested a production-substituting model of smuggling in which price disparity due to cost of supply is critically important as an incentive for smuggling of goods that are substitutes of locally produced goods. This price disparity is caused by domestic consumption taxes as well as import duties. Drawing attention to the case of cigarette, Chowdhury suggested that, in Bangladesh, smuggling of cigarettes reduced the level of domestic production. Domestic production of cigarettes is subject to VAT and other consumption taxes. Reduction of domestic taxes enables the local producer to supply at a lower cost and bring down the price disparity that encourages smuggling. However, Chowdhury suggested that there is a limit beyond which reducing domestic taxes on production cannot be feasible for adding competitive advantage vis-à-vis smuggled cigarettes.  Therefore, government needs to upscale its anti-smuggling drive so that seizures can add to the cost of smuggling and render smuggling uncompetitive thereby. Notably, Chowdhury modelled the case of the smuggler vis-a-vis the local producer as one of antagonistic duopoly

Rent seeking bureaucracy
Economic explanation of bureaucracy was forward by William Niskanen who theorized a model of budget maximizing bureaucracy. Patrick Dunleavy offered an alternative theory of bureau-shaping bureaucracy. Both of them focused on the nature and behaviour of only top level bureaucrats. In contrast, Chowdhury offered the concept of rent seeking bureaucracy in which the cost of producing and supplying public goods is pushed up by the rent-seeking nature of public servants of all levels. It is rent or bribe that adds to the cost of production.

Market in corruption
In explaining economics of corruption, Chowdhury theorized that a market in corruption exists in public bureaucracy. The level of corruption is determined by the demand and supply forces as apply to other commodities and services. In the public offices, corruption is demanded by the clients (e.g. a tax-payer) and it is the civil servants who supply it (e.g. a tax collector). Chowdhury suggested that corruption could be controlled if direct and physical interaction between the civil servants and their clients could be removed whereby the market in corruption would be rendered inoperative. Human interface in the public office could be avoided through automation, computerization and inter-active web-technology. In absence of human interface, scope for negotiation for a corrupt deal and payment of kick-back would be naturally removed resulting in lowering of the level of corruption.

Publications

Literary
(a) Jibanananda Daser "Aat Bochor Ager Ek Deen (literary criticism)(ed.), 1994: Dibya Prokash, Dhaka.
(b) Jibanananda Daser "Godhuli Sandhir Nritya" (literary criticism)(ed.), 1995: Dibya Prokash, Dhaka.
(c) Jibanananda Daser "Mrityur Aage" (literary criticism)(ed.), 2000: Dibya Prokash, Dhaka. 
(d) Oprakashito Jibanananda 51 (Poetry anthology) (ed.), 2000 : Mawla Brothers, Dhaka
(e) Amiyo Chakrabartyr Sreshtha Prabandha (Anthology of Essays) (ed.). 1998: Mawla Brothers, Dhaka
(f) Jibanananda Daser Prabandha Samagra (Anthology of Essays) (ed.), 2000: 2nd edition, Mawla Brothers, Dhaka.
(g) Stories of Nadine Gordimer (translated)(ed. with Introduction), 1992: Dibya Prokash, Dhaka. 
(h) Oliver Friggeirie's Koranta and Other Short Stories from Malta (translated) (ed), Desh Prokason, 1998: Dhaka. 
(i) Chotoder, Boroder (Collection of Bengali rhymes) (ed.), 1990: Shilpataru, Dhaka.
(j) Shilpa Shahitye Nagnata Jounata Oshlilata (Anthology of Essays with Introduction)(ed.), 2000 : Dibya Prokash, Dhaka
(k) Arundhati Roy's "Avilash Talkies" (Translated with Introduction), 1999: Dibya Prokash, Dhaka
(l) Jibanananda Daser Agranthitha Prabandhabali (Anthology of uncompiled essays by poet Jibanananda das) (ed.), 2000: Mawla Brothers, Dhaka.
(m) Prasanga : Jibanananda (Literary essays on poet Jibanananda Das), 2000: Somoy Prokashon, Dhaka. 
(n) Bengali Essays of Nirad C. Chowdhury (Anthology of Essays with Introduction)(ed.), 2000 : Somoy Prokashon, Dhaka.
(o) Jibanananda Bibechona (Anthology of essays on poet Jibanananda Das with Introduction)(ed.), 1999: Anya Prokash, Dhaka.
(p) Jibanananda – Tulonay, Shomporkey (Anthology of comparative essays on poet Jibanananda Das with Introduction)(ed.), 2000 : Somoy Prokashon, Dhaka.
(q) Poems from Jibanananda Das (ed. Tr.), 1995: Creative Workshop, Chittagong.
(r) Homosexual References in Bengali Literature, 1999: Jijnasa, Calcutta.
(s) Voice of Hayat Saif, (ed. Tr.), 1999: Desh Prokashan, Dhaka
(t) Beyond Land and Time, 2007, Pathak Samabesh, Dhaka.
(u) Essays on Jibanananda Das, 2009, Pathak Samabesh, Dhaka.

Social science
 Chowdhury, F. L. (1992) Evasion of Customs Duty in Bangladesh, unpublished MBA dissertation submitted to Monash University, Australia
 Chowdhury, F. L. (1994) 'An Estimate of under-invoicing in relation to Bangladesh's import from seven Asian partner countries', Fiscal Frontier, Dhaka
 Chowdhury, F. L. (1995) 'Need for upgrading fiscal reforms for small and medium enterprises in Bangladesh', Keynote paper presented in a seminar organized by Dhaka Chamber of Commerce & Industry (DCCI), Dhaka, Bangladesh
 Chowdhury, F. L. (1999) A production-substitution model of Smuggling, Keynote paper presented in a seminar organized by the National Board of Revenue, Dhaka, Bangladesh
 Chowdhury, F. L. (2006) Corrupt bureaucracy and privatization of Customs in Bangladesh, Pathok Samabesh, Dhaka.

References 

Living people
1959 births
20th-century Bangladeshi economists
Bangladeshi male writers
Bengali writers
Bengali–English translators
Literary critics
People from Mymensingh District
Bangladeshi civil servants